The fifteenth season of ABC reality television series The Bachelor premiered on January 3, 2011. 38-year-old Brad Womack, who previously appeared as the Bachelor in season 11, where he rejected both of his final two women, returned as the Bachelor for this season. Womack became the first lead to appear on The Bachelor franchise twice.

The season concluded on March 14, 2011, with Womack choosing to propose to 24-year-old single mother Emily Maynard. The couple announced that they ended their engagement on June 29, 2011.

Production

Casting and contestants
Casting began during On the Wings of Love. Potential candidates for this season including Womack, as well as Ty Brown and Chris Lambton from (Ali's season) season six of The Bachelorette. Eventually, both were turned down the offer. On September 22, 2010, Womack was first rumored as the next Bachelor but he was officially confirmed to return the series five days later during the live show of season eleven of Dancing with the Stars.

Notable contestants including Emily Maynard, who was the fiancée of Ricky Hendrick; and Radio City Rockette Keltie Busch.

Filming and development
This season traveled to far-flung locales in Las Vegas, Nevada, Costa Rica, the British overseas territory of Anguilla and South Africa. Appearances on this season included Drew Pinsky, Train and Seal.

Contestants

The cast was revealed on December 17, 2010. Biographical information according to ABC official series site, plus footnoted additions.

Future appearances

The Bachelorette
Ashley Hebert was chosen as lead of the seventh season of The Bachelorette. Emily Maynard was chosen as the lead of the eighth season of The Bachelorette the following year.

Bachelor Pad
Alli Travis, Jackie Gordon, Melissa Schreiber and Michelle Money returned for the second season of Bachelor Pad. Travis was eliminated during week 1, Gordon during week 2, and Schreiber during week 4. Money and her partner, Graham Bunn, were eliminated during week 7, finishing as the runners-up.

The Bachelor
Shawntel Newton appeared in one episode of the sixteenth season of The Bachelor.

Bachelor in Paradise
Money returned for the first season of Bachelor in Paradise. She ended the season in a relationship with Cody Sattler.

Other appearances
Outside of the Bachelor Nation franchise, Lisa Morrisey appeared as a contestant in the Bachelors vs. Bachelorettes special on the season 7 of Wipeout.

Call-out order

 The contestant received the first impression rose
 The contestant received a rose during the date
 The contestant received a rose after receiving advice from Ali and Roberto
 The contestant was eliminated
 The contestant was eliminated during the date
 The contestant quit the competition
 The contestant was eliminated outside the rose ceremony
 The contestant won the competition

Episodes

References

External links

15
2011 American television seasons
Television shows filmed in California
Television shows shot in the Las Vegas Valley
Television shows filmed in Costa Rica
Television shows filmed in Anguilla
Television shows filmed in Washington (state)
Television shows filmed in Maine
Television shows filmed in North Carolina
Television shows filmed in New York City
Television shows filmed in South Africa